Angela Bundalovic (born 1995) is a Danish actress. She is best known for her role as Beatrice in the Netflix television series The Rain (2018), Nadja in Limboland (2020), and Miu in Copenhagen Cowboy (2022).

Life and career
Angela Bundalovic studied dance and choreography at the Danish National School of Performing Arts (Den Danske Scenekunstskole).

She made her screen acting debut as Dommeren's daughter in the film Dark Horse, which was screened in the Un Certain Regard section at the 2005 Cannes Film Festival. Her next film role was as the seven-year-old Sidsel in the 2006 short film Blood Sisters. In 2018, she played Beatrice in the first season of the Netflix series The Rain.

Bundalovic returned to the stage during the 2018/2019 season as a dancer in Frédéric Geis's Uranus and in Ingri Fiksdal's Shadows of Tomorrow. Bundalovic plays the junkie Nadja in the 2020 Danish television series Limboland.

In 2022, she is set to carry the lead role in the Martin Skovbjerg Jensen-directed film København findes ikke ("Copenhagen doesn't exist").
The same year, Bundalovic took the lead role of Mui in the Nicolas Winding Refn Danish supernatural crime series Copenhagen Cowboy.
The series was released on Netflix in 2023.

Filmography

Film

Television

Music videos

References

External links
 
 Angela Bundalovic at the Danish National School of Performing Arts (Den Danske Scenekunstskole)
 Angela Bundalovic at All That Management talent agency

Living people
21st-century Danish actresses
Danish film actresses
Danish television actresses
1995 births